Thomas J. Kennedy (September 28, 1884 – January 9, 1937) was an American long-distance runner. He competed in the men's marathon at the 1904 Summer Olympics.

References

External links
 

1884 births
1937 deaths
Athletes (track and field) at the 1904 Summer Olympics
American male long-distance runners
American male marathon runners
Olympic track and field athletes of the United States
Place of birth missing
20th-century American people